The Finley Heights are rugged coastal heights rising to  between the mouths of Bingham Glacier and Lurabee Glacier, on the east coast of Palmer Land, Antarctica. They were discovered by Sir Hubert Wilkins in an aerial flight on December 20, 1928. He considered the heights to be islands lying in a great transverse channel across the Antarctic Peninsula and named them "Finley Islands" for John H. Finley of The New York Times, who was then president of the American Geographical Society. Correlation of aerial photographs taken by Lincoln Ellsworth in 1935 and preliminary reports of the findings of the British Graham Land Expedition (BGLE), 1934–37, led W.L.G. Joerg to interpret this to be joined to the mainland. In published reports, members of the BGLE have concurred in this interpretation which was also borne out by the results of subsequent flights and a sledge trip from East Base, in 1940, by members of the United States Antarctic Service.

References 

Mountains of Palmer Land